Harold Clarence "Mush" March (October 18, 1908 – January 9, 2002) was a Canadian ice hockey player in the National Hockey League. He is best remembered for scoring the game-winning goal in the second overtime of game four of the 1934 Stanley Cup Finals to lift the Chicago Black Hawks to a 3-1 series triumph.

Playing career
March was a right winger who played for seventeen seasons, all with the Chicago Black Hawks, from 1928–29 to 1944–45. During that span, he played 759 games, scoring 153 goals and 230 assists, for 383 points. Since the Black Hawks were not an overly successful team during most of those 17 years, March only played in a total of 45 playoff games, but he made the most of those 45 games by scoring 12 goals, 15 assists for 27 points. He also scored the first ever goal at Maple Leaf Gardens in 1931. He kept the puck and dropped it at the Gardens final game in 1999.

Awards and achievements
1934 Stanley Cup champion  (Chicago)
1938 Stanley Cup champion  (Chicago)
Scored the first goal in the long history of Maple Leaf Gardens on November 12, 1931. On February 13, 1999 as part of the final game played at the Gardens (also between the Maple Leafs and Blackhawks), he officiated at the ceremonial opening faceoff - with the very same puck that he had used to score that first goal almost 68 years before.
He became the second recorded player in hockey history to win the Stanley Cup for his team on an overtime goal.
He was the last surviving member of Black Hawks 1934 Stanley Cup team.

Career statistics

References

External links

1908 births
2002 deaths
Canadian ice hockey right wingers
Chicago Blackhawks players
Ice hockey people from Saskatchewan
Stanley Cup champions
Canadian expatriate ice hockey players in the United States